John Tallmadge Ph.D., is an author and essayist on issues related to nature and culture. He is currently in private practice as an educational and literary consultant after thirty-year career in higher education, most recently as a core professor of Literature and Environmental Studies at Union Institute and University (TUI)(?) in Cincinnati, Ohio. He served as president of the Association for the Study of Literature and Environment (ASLE) and director of the Orion Society. He is a U.S. Army veteran.

Biography
John Tallmadge grew up in northern New Jersey. He credits his urban upbringing with instilling in him "a childhood longing for lakes and forests". He increasingly experienced the natural world at Dartmouth College and visiting Big Sur and the High Sierra while in the Army. Those experiences encouraged him to explore nature writers like Thoreau and John Muir. The outdoors complimented the academic work that he was pursuing and he applied his graduate studies in comparative literature to his passion for the outdoors.

Patricia Hassler stated in a Booklist review that as a young idealist "Tallmadge sought the authenticity, power, and possibility of the wilderness by following the intellectual and physical trails blazed by Henry Thoreau and John Muir... he takes us along on his hikes to the High Sierra, Katahdin, and the Deeps and Canyonlands where, like some knight-errant, he proves himself over and over. If his teaching tenure is denied, Tallmadge realizes he has learned nature's lessons: just as water overcomes through nonresistance and the jack pine needs fire to release its seeds, man endures through spirit and faith."

His studies in nature writing fall under the genre of ecocriticism, a term coined by William Rueckert in 1978, and focus on the works of Thoreau, John Muir, Edward Abbey, and Aldo Leopold, to name just a few.

He served in the United States Army in California in the late 1960s in a Russian language program.

Tallmadge is married. He lives with his family in Cincinnati.

Professional overview
Tallmadge graduated from Dartmouth College in 1969 summa cum laude before, as noted on Tallmadge's website, the "Army preempted grad school." He received his PhD from Yale University in 1977 in comparative literature. He proceeded to teach at Yale, the University of Utah, Carleton College, the Associated Colleges of the Midwest, and Dartmouth College, before settling at TUI. He served as a dean there from 1987 to 1992.

In addition to his academic work at TUI, Tallmadge worked as a consultant in developing curricula at Green Mountain College, University of Kentucky, and Antioch University New England. He consulted at Concordia College, Chatham College, the Roger Tory Peterson Institute, and the Cincinnati Museum of Natural History and Science. He offers workshops on the themes of nature and human values, spirituality, and writing, as well as seminars on personal and professional development for college faculty.  He also reads and lectures widely on college and university campuses.

Besides his books Tallmadge has been published in the Utne Reader, Orion magazine, Audubon Magazine, Whole Terrain, the Michigan Quarterly Review, the Interdisciplinary Studies in
Literature and Environment (ISLE), the North Dakota Quarterly, the Emerson Society Quarterly, and Witness, among others.

Works
Leslie, Clare Walker, John Tallmadge, and Tom Wessels. Into the Field: A Guide to Locally Focused Learning (Orion Society, 2005).  
Tallmadge, John. Meeting the Tree of Life: A Teacher's Path (University of Utah Press, 1997). 
Tallmadge, John, and Harry Harrington, eds. Reading Under the Sign of Nature: New Essays in Ecocriticism (University of Utah Press, 2000). 
Tallmadge, John. The Cincinnati Arch: Learning from Nature in the City (University of Georgia Press, 2004).

Articles available online
A Matter of Scale
Deerslayer with a Degree
Meeting the Tree of Life
Narrative Ecocriticism
The Nature of Terror
The Wild Within
Toward a Natural History of Reading

References

Defining Ecocritical Theory and Practice
Primer for Outdoor Educators from ERICDigests.org
Union Institute and University Network recently published books Winter 2004-2005
University of Georgia Books
Whole Terrain profile of John Tallmadge

External links
Whole Terrain link to Tallmadge's articles published in Whole Terrain
Whole Terrain podcasts on nature and nature writing 1. Thoreau, 2. Where is Nature?, 3. On Nature Writing
Grand Rapids Community College Sustainability Series podcasts.  1.  Creative Sustainability lecture, 2. Reading from The Cincinnati Arch
Guest on *Anyplace Wild TV Show, Season 3, Episode 3: Chasing Thoreau's Ghost: Canoeing and Hiking in Maine
Blog: The Staying Alive Project for faculty development

Year of birth missing (living people)
Living people
American non-fiction environmental writers
Carleton College faculty
University of Utah faculty
Dartmouth College alumni
People from New Jersey
United States Army soldiers
Yale University alumni
Yale University faculty